Bharti Foundation is the philanthropic arm of Bharti Enterprises, an Indian business conglomerate based in New Delhi. It conducts free programs in both primary and higher education for the underprivileged children, with a particular focus on girls. The Satya Bharti School Program, started in 2006, is the flagship program of Bharti Foundation. The foundation has been recognized by many societies and award committees for its corporate social responsibility programs.

The foundation, based in Gurgaon, India, is governed by 16 board members, including Sunil Bharti Mittal as its Chairman and Rakesh Bharti Mittal as its Co-Chairman. This foundation almost run 5 senior secondary school and totally 254 school in India. This foundation also contributes in the different initiatives started by Indian government. The all 5 senior secondary schools are opened in Punjab state. These 5 schools are giving excellent board results of class 10th and 12th.  There are almost 45,000 students in all the 254 schools. The foundation freely provide shoes, uniform, sweaters, books and note books to all students. This foundation give the scholarship to those students who scored above 80% in class 12th.

Awards
 2008:Asian CSR Award
 2019: The Global CSR Award.
 2011: The Indian Education Award 2011, 
 2011: World Education Award 2011.

References

Educational charities
Organizations established in 2000
Organisations based in Haryana
2000 establishments in Haryana